Indonesia women's national under-20 football team represents Indonesia at international association football tournaments.

Coaches

Coaching staff

Players

Current squad
The following 23 players were called up for the 2024 AFC U-20 Women's Asian Cup qualification.

Competitive record

AFF Championship

Results 
International Matches in last 12 months, and future scheduled matches

2022

2023

See also
 Indonesia women's national football team
 Indonesia women's national under-17 football team

References

External links

 Official website
 FIFA profile

Asian women's national under-20 association football teams
U